Haridas Siddhanta Vagish was an Indian writer and translator of Bengali literature and a Sanskrit scholar. He translated several Indian epics and classics into Bengali language which included Mahabharata, Shakuntala and Meghadūta. The Government of India awarded him Padma Bhushan, the third highest Indian civilian award, in 1960.

See also

 Kalidasa
 Vyasa

References

External links
 

Recipients of the Padma Bhushan in literature & education
Writers from West Bengal
Bengali writers
20th-century Indian translators
Sanskrit scholars from Bengal
Year of birth missing
Year of death missing